SS Laura Bridgman was a Liberty ship built in the United States during World War II. She was named after Laura Bridgman, the first deaf-blind American child to gain a significant education in the English language.

Construction
Laura Bridgman was laid down on 23 September 1944, under a Maritime Commission (MARCOM) contract, MC hull 2382, by J.A. Jones Construction, Brunswick, Georgia; she was sponsored by Ida Purcell, the wife of bishop Clare Purcell, and launched on 30 October 1944.

History
She was allocated to Seas Shipping Co., Inc., on 13 November 1944. On 16 October 1945, she was laid up in the National Defense Reserve Fleet, in the Suisun Bay Group. She was removed from the fleet on 26 June 1950, to be loaded with grain, she relocated to the National Defense Reserve Fleet, in the Hudson River Group, on 13 July 1950. On 12 December 1950, she was withdrawn from the fleet to be unloaded, she returned to the fleet empty on 19 December 1950. On 17 January 1951, she was sold to Drytrans, Inc., and renamed Catherine. In September 1957, she was transferred to a Liberian shipping company. On 14 May 1958, she was sold to Penntrans Co., and renamed Penn Explorer. She was again sold to a Liberian company on 29 November 1961. She was scrapped in 1968.

References

Bibliography

 
 
 
 
 

 

Liberty ships
Ships built in Brunswick, Georgia
1944 ships
Suisun Bay Reserve Fleet
Hudson River Reserve Fleet